Daniel Koperberg (born December 8, 1997) is a Russian-born Israeli basketball player for Maccabi Haifa of the Israeli National League.

Early years
Koperberg was born in Saint Petersburg, Russia, and was adopted by an Israeli family a few months after his birth. Koperberg grew up in Haifa, Israel, where he played for Maccabi Haifa's youth team and the Hebrew Reali high-school team.

Professional career
On July 7, 2016, Koperberg signed a three-year contract with Maccabi Haifa. That season, Koperberg participated at the Israeli League All-Star Game and the Slam Dunk Contest.

On January 9, 2018, Koperberg signed a two-year contract extension with Maccabi Haifa. At the same day, he was loaned to Hapoel Afula of the Israeli National League for the rest of the season.

In the 2018–19 season, Koperberg won the 2019 Israeli National League Championship title with Haifa, earning a promotion back to the Israeli Premier League.

On December 23, 2019, Koperberg parted ways with Haifa.

On December 30, 2019, Koperberg signed a three-year deal with Hapoel Tel Aviv.

Israeli national team
Koperberg was a member of the Israeli Under-18 national team.

In July 2017, Koperberg helped the Israeli Under-20 national team to reach the 2017 FIBA Europe Under-20 Championship finals by averaging 10.7 points and 6.9 rebounds per game. One month later, he participated at the 2017 Summer Universiade.

References

External links
 RealGM.com profile
 Basket.co.il profile

1997 births
Living people
Centers (basketball)
Hapoel Afula players
Hapoel Tel Aviv B.C. players
Israeli men's basketball players
Maccabi Haifa B.C. players
Basketball players from Saint Petersburg
Russian emigrants to Israel